not to be confused with the Ben Jonson play Volpone.

Volponi (foaled 1998 in Kentucky) is an American Thoroughbred racehorse. Bred by trainer Philip G. Johnson's family operation, Amherst Stable, he was sired by Florida Derby winner  Cryptoclearance. His dam, Prom Knight, was a daughter of the 1987 Irish Derby winner Sir Harry Lewis, who was a son of the great French runner Alleged, who won back-to-back editions of the Prix de l'Arc de Triomphe.

In 2002, Volponi earned the most important win of his career when he won the Breeders' Cup Classic by 6½ lengths, the largest margin in the race's history at the time. In winning the Classic, Volponi overcame odds of 44-to-1 to beat an outstanding field that included runner-up Medaglia d'Oro, Milwaukee Brew, Evening Attire, Macho Uno, Hawk Wing, War Emblem, and Harlan's Holiday, among others. His longshot victory inadvertently exposed the largest betting scandal in the United States in a century.

At age five, Volponi made eight starts in 2003 without a win but had five seconds and two third-place finishes. Retired to stud duty, his offspring have met with limited success in racing. At the end of 2005, he was sent to KRA Jeju Stud Farm in South Korea. To date, his best runner in terms of career earnings is daughter Clearly Foxy, who won the 2007 Grade III Natalma Stakes.

Pedigree

References
 Volponi's pedigree and partial racing stats
 Volponi's complete race record
 Volponi at the Thoroughbred Times Interactive Stallion Directory

1998 racehorse births
Racehorses bred in Kentucky
Racehorses trained in the United States
Breeders' Cup Classic winners
Thoroughbred family 16-f